The Sinful Village is a 1966 West German comedy film directed by Werner Jacobs and starring Michl Lang, Marianne Lindner and Gunther Philipp. It was based on the play Das sündige Dorf by Max Neal which had previously been made into a 1940 film of the same title.

Cast
Michl Lang as Thomas Stangassinger
Marianne Lindner as Therese Stangassinger
Gunther Philipp as Korbinian
Thomas Alder as Sepp Stangassinger
Hannelore Auer as Afra
Hans-Jürgen Bäumler as Herbert Stangassianger
Beppo Brem as Vogelhuber
Peggy March as Sängerin
Franz Muxeneder as Wegscheidbauer
Margitta Scherr as Vevi
Ruth Stephan as Barbara Veit
Manfred Streibert as Boeller-Birtel
Hubert von Meyerinck as Anwalt

See also
The Sinful Village (1940)
The Sinful Village (1954)

References

Bibliography
 Goble, Alan. The Complete Index to Literary Sources in Film. Walter de Gruyter, 1999.

External links
 

1966 films
1966 comedy films
German comedy films
West German films
1960s German-language films
German films based on plays
Films directed by Werner Jacobs
Remakes of German films
Films set in Bavaria
Films set in the Alps
1960s German films